Ballroom Streets is a 1978 double album released by Melanie. The album is essentially a live album but recorded in the studio with a small audience. It mixed new recordings of old songs with some new songs. When first issued on CD in 1989, it did not contain "Holding Out", "Any Guy", "Groundhog Day" and "Friends and Company". There was a rare promotional only 12-inch single with the songs "Cyclone (Candles in the Rain)" and "Running After Love" [Tomato TOM 12D-0004] distributed at the time of the album's release.

Track listing
All songs written by Melanie Safka except where noted.
"Running After Love" – 4:24 
"Holdin' Out" – 3:15
"Cyclone / Candles in the Rain" – 7:18 
"Beautiful Sadness" – 5:43 
"Do You Believe" – 3:52 
"Nickel Song" – 3:03
"Any Guy" – 3:08
"What Have They Done to My Song Ma" – 4:17
"I Believe" – 3:49 
"Poet" – 3:50 
"Save Me" – 6:53 
"Together Alone" – 3:26 
"Ruby Tuesday" (Keith Richards, Mick Jagger) – 6:36 
"Buckle Down" – 3:14 
"Miranda" (Phil Ochs) – 3:46 
"Brand New Key" – 3:38 
"Groundhog Day" – 4:01
"Friends and Company" – 6:50

Melanie - acoustic guitar, vocals
Sal DiTroia - acoustic guitar
Tony Battaglia – guitar, slide guitar, bass
Luis Cabaza – keyboards	
Robbie Georgia – dobro, rhythm guitar, backing vocals
Stan Kipper – drums, backing vocals
Bob Leone – bass
John Tegthoff - organ, backing vocals
Mary McCaffrey – vocals
The Persuasions – backing vocals
T.C. – backing vocals
Technical
Peter Schekeryk – producer
Michael Laskow, Paul Kaminsky – engineer
Benno Friedman - cover photography
Gregg Lamping - tech engineer

Charts

References 

1978 albums
Melanie (singer) albums
Tomato Records albums